USS Grumium (AK-112/IX-174/AVS-3) was a  and aviation supply ship in the service of the US Navy in World War II. Named after the star Grumium in the constellation Draco, it was the only ship of the Navy to bear this name.

Construction
Grumium was laid down under a Maritime Commission (MARCOM) contract, MCE hull 443, on 12 November 1942, as the liberty ship SS William G. McAdoo, by  the Permanente Metals Corporation, Yard No. 2, in Richmond, California. She was launched on 20 December 1942, sponsored by Mrs. T. Y. Sturtevant. William G. McAdoo was acquired by the Navy on 5 October 1943. The ship was converted for Navy use by the Todd Shipyards in Seattle, Washington and commissioned on 20 October 1943.

Service history
Grumium loaded supplies at San Francisco 9 November, and got underway from San Pedro 19 November 1943, bound for Pago Pago. The ship unloaded drum gas there and at Funafuti 8 to 11 December, after which she proceeded to Kwajalein 6 March, and Eniwetok 15 March, delivering oil and aviation fuel. After another stop at Kwajalein 26 to 28 April, Grumium returned to San Francisco via Pearl Harbor, arriving in California 27 May 1944.

Conversion 
At San Francisco Grumium was transferred to the direct control of Commander, Naval Air Forces, Pacific Fleet, and underwent conversion to an aviation support ship. She was redesignated IX-174, 20 June 1944, and 2 days later was underway for Pearl Harbor once more, to supply American fast carrier aircraft, then increasing greatly in numbers.

Late war service 
Grumium arrived Pearl Harbor 30 June, and 10 July, continued to Roi Island. Arriving 19 July, the ship transferred supplies to aircraft groups until early September, then returned to Pearl Harbor. She sailed with another load of aviation supplies 28 September, calling at Ulithi and Eniwetok before arriving at Manus on 17 November. There she supplied carrier forces making the supporting strikes for the Philippine campaign, as America’s great island offensive gained momentum. Remaining at Manus until 5 December 1944, Grumium sailed to a closer advance base, Ulithi, arriving four days later. From Ulithi the ship supported the far reaching air raids on the Philippines, Okinawa, and Formosa in the months to come.

As US forces moved ever north and west, supplies had to be moved into new advance bases, and Grumium sailed 14 January 1945, to bring up aviation supplies from Manus to Ulithi. Then she made a similar voyage to Roi Island before moving her supply base to Guam 16 March 1945. The ship was soon to carry her support activities to the assault area itself, however, and rendezvoused with an Okinawa-bound convey at Saipan 23 March.

Supporting Okinawa invasion operations 
 
As American forces went ashore at Okinawa 1 April, and began that campaign, Grumium made preparations to supply the cruising carrier groups from Kerama Retto, near Okinawa. Arriving 2 April, she serviced the escort carrier groups protecting the landing and providing group support. Japanese forces were determined to defeat the assault and quickly expanded suicide attacks against the assembled ships. Grumium came under air attack at Kerama Retto 6–7 April; of the many planes destroyed she helped shoot down one. She also rescued survivors from a suicide crash on  28 April, and a bomb hit on  30 April.

While Grumium was at Kerama Retto, a special designation for aviation supply ships was established; and she became AVS-3 on 25 May 1945. She departed the Okinawa area 6 June, arrived Guam 14 June, and arrived Eniwetok to supply the carrier forces 1 July 1945. Grumium remained there during and after the final operations of the war providing vital supplies until departing for the Hawaiian Islands 12 October. Stopping briefly at Pearl Harbor, she arrived Norfolk via the Panama Canal 25 November, for deactivation. Decommissioned 20 December 1945, she was redelivered to the Maritime Commission 27 December 1945.

Inactivation and decommissioning 
The ship was subsequently laid up in the National Defense Reserve Fleet, James River Group, Lee Hall, Virginia. Grumium, along with the Liberty ship SS George Pomutz, was sold for $203,600, on 17 April 1970, to N. V. Intershita. She was delivered 18 May 1970, and subsequently sold to Salvamento y Demolicion Naval S. A., Barcelona, Spain, for scrapping, completed, 27 October 1970.

Awards 
Grumium received one battle stars for World War II service.

Notes 

Citations

Bibliography 

Online resources

External links

Crater-class cargo ships
World War II auxiliary ships of the United States
Ships built in Richmond, California
1942 ships
James River Reserve Fleet